Bruce Creek is a stream in the U.S. state of Montana. It is a tributary to Addition Creek.

Bruce Creek was named after Donald Bruce, a forestry official.

References

Rivers of Montana
Rivers of Flathead County, Montana